Raiffeisen Flyers Wels, formerly WBC Wels, is a professional basketball club based in Wels, Austria. The team plays in the Austrian Basketball League since it was founded in 2000. In 2009 the team won the Austrian national championship. The club was founded as Welser Basketball Club in 2000 through a merger of the clubs Union Wels and ABC Sparkasse Wels.

Trophies

Austrian Championship
Winners (1): 2008–09
Austrian Cup
Winners (1): 2005–06

Season by season

Players

Notable players

External links
Eurobasket.com WBC Raiffeisen Wels Page

Basketball teams in Austria
Basketball teams established in 2000